Frank Farmer (September 26, 1900 Philadelphia, Pennsylvania – August 28, 1932 Perth Amboy, New Jersey) was an American racecar driver. Farmer made 10 Championship Car starts in his career with a best finish of 3rd in the June 1930 race at Altoona Speedway. He was killed in a crash at Woodbridge Speedway.

Indy 500 results

1900 births
1932 deaths
Indianapolis 500 drivers
Racing drivers who died while racing
Sports deaths in New Jersey
Racing drivers from Philadelphia